In mathematics, a double vector bundle is the combination of two compatible vector bundle structures, which contains in particular the tangent  of a vector bundle  and the double tangent bundle .

Definition and first consequences
 the projection, the addition, the scalar multiplication and the zero map on E for both vector bundle structures are morphisms.

Double vector bundle morphism

The 'flip of the double vector bundle  is the double vector bundle .

Examples

If  is a vector bundle over a differentiable manifold  then  is a double vector bundle when considering its secondary vector bundle structure.

If  is a differentiable manifold, then its double tangent bundle  is a double vector bundle.

References

Differential geometry
Topology
Differential topology